Akuila Yabaki is a Fijian human rights activist and Methodist clergyman.  From 2002 to 2015 he was Executive Director of the Citizens Constitutional Forum, a pro-democracy organization.

The Methodist Church of Fiji and Rotuma dismissed Yabaki from the pulpit in 2001. No reason for the dismissal was given at the time, although political disagreements were widely thought to be involved.  He continued to use the title Reverend.

Yabaki was a strong critic of some policies and decisions of the Qarase government of 2000 to 2006, including the early release from prison of persons convicted on charges related to the 2000 Fijian coup d'état, and opposed the Reconciliation, Tolerance, and Unity Bill seeking to establish an amnesty for such persons.

In the leadup to the 2006 Fijian coup d'état Yabaki called for mediation between the military and the government. Following the coup he warned the military regime that it would face legal action over the legality of the government and its abuse of human rights.

In May 2013 he was convicted of scandalising the court over an article in the CCF newsletter in which he raised doubts about the independence of Fiji's judiciary under the military regime. He was given a fine and a suspended prison sentence.

References

Year of birth missing (living people)
People excommunicated by Methodist churches
Living people
I-Taukei Fijian Methodist ministers
People from Kadavu Province
People educated at Lelean Memorial School